Grupo Famsa was a retail company engaged in the purchase and sale of household appliances, electronic products, furniture, clothing and other consumer products in Mexico and United States. Today the company has 379 stores in 78 Mexican cities and 22 stores in Texas and Illinois, where 23 % of the Hispanic population of the USA resides. The company has its headquarters in Monterrey, Mexico.

It also manufactures furniture and provides banking and credit services, including personal car financing through its Banco Ahorro Famsa. The bank has 359 banking branches within its stores in Mexico. In Famsa locations in the United States, customers can order deliveries of goods to locations in the United States and Mexico.

In addition, Famsa is in the footwear catalog business. The company serves wholesale and retail customers through retail branches and wholesale warehouses. The company was founded in 1970 in Monterrey.

In 2023, Grupo Famsa closed many stores, the 3 Famsa stores remains opened with the possible ceasing operations.

History
Don Humberto Garza opened the Fabricantes Muebleros, his first store. The store became Famsa, which spread throughout Mexico beginning in 1975. Famsa opened its first United States location in Los Angeles in late 2000. Famsa intended to target the growing Hispanic American population. In 2005 the company made $1 billion United States dollars in sales; its United States sales made up 11.9 percent of its figure. In 2006 Famsa had 25 U.S. stores; during that year the company planned to open 25 additional United States locations by 2010. In early 2006 Famsa opened operations in Guatemala and planned to begin deliveries to El Salvador.

On 26 June 2020  Grupo Famsa reported in a statement to the Mexican Stock Exchange that it filed a voluntary application under Chapter 11 of the Bankruptcy Code of the United States

In an August 6 2020 a shareholder meeting authorized a request to file for Chapter 15 Bankruptcy in the United States and bankruptcy in Mexico.

In 2023, Famsa closed their stores in Mexico only 3 stores open.

See also

 CLABE

References

External links
 Grupo Famsa
 Grupo Famsa 
 Famsa Mexico 
 Famsa USA
 Famsa USA 

Companies listed on the Mexican Stock Exchange
Retail companies of Mexico
Mexican brands
Companies based in Monterrey